Uğur Mumcu (22 August 1942 – 24 January 1993) was a Turkish investigative journalist for the daily Cumhuriyet. He was assassinated by a bomb placed in his car outside his home.

Biography 
Uğur Mumcu was born the third of four siblings in Kırşehir. He went to school in Ankara and in 1961 attended School of Law at Ankara University. Graduating in 1965 he initially began his career practicing law. In 1969 he ended his legal career to return to his alma mater; working as a teaching assistant until 1972.

He started to write during university, first in the magazine Yön and then in several other leftist periodicals. Between 1968 and 1970, he wrote articles on politics for the newspapers Akşam, Cumhuriyet and Milliyet. 

Arrested shortly after the 1971 military coup, he was tortured. He was writing for Ortam which was a weekly political magazine based in Istanbul when he was arrested. Later, Mumcu wrote that his torturers had told him: "We are the Counter-Guerrilla. Even the President of the Republic cannot touch us."

In 1974, Uğur Mumcu started a career as a columnist, with the daily newspaper Yeni Ortam and from 1975 on, in the daily Cumhuriyet, which he continued until his death.

Research 

Uğur Mumcu is hailed as the first investigative journalist of modern Turkey. He published books on current and historical political issues in Turkey. He was investigating the Kurdistan Workers' Party's ties with the National Intelligence Organization (MİT) at the time of his assassination.

Shortly before his death, Mumcu was investigating how 100,000 firearms owned by the Turkish Armed Forces had ended up in the possession of Jalal Talabani, one of the Kurdish leaders of northern Iraq and, as of 2008, president of Iraq. Twenty-five days after the death of Mumcu, General Eşref Bitlis, who had been investigating the same issue, died in a plane crash, believed to be due to sabotage. In his 8 January Cumhuriyet article, titled Ültimatom, Mumcu emphatically stated that he would soon reveal in a new book the ties between Kurdish nationalists and some intelligence organizations (i.e., Abdullah Öcalan and the National Intelligence Organization).

According to his son, Özgür, Mumcu had an appointment with retired prosecutor Baki Tuğ on 27 January to learn more about Abdullah Öcalan's suspected ties with the MİT (the state was officially fighting his militant organization, the PKK). Öcalan was detained on 31 March 1972 while studying political sciences at the University of Ankara. Per clause 16/1 of the Martial Law (№ 1402), he was sentenced to three months in jail for participating in a boycott. He was released on 24 October 1972 after the National Intelligence Organization forwarded a message to the prosecutor handling the case, Tuğ, that one of the suspects was one of their agents. Tuğ later said that he could not remember whether the agent was Öcalan, or one of the other suspects.

Assassination 
On the morning of 24 January 1993, Mumcu left his home and was killed by a C-4 plastic bomb as he started his car, a Renault 12, license numbered 06 YR 245.

There are numerous hypotheses over who was responsible for his murder. Given the various links (at an organizational and personal level) between the Turkish deep state and Turkish armed forces, Counter-Guerrilla, Kurdish forces and the CIA and Mossad, the hypotheses are not necessarily mutually exclusive, especially as Mumcu was investigating some of these links.

Deep state hypothesis 
One hypothesis is that he was killed to protect state secrets regarding the PKK. PKK supreme council member Mustafa Karasu alleged that Mumcu was killed by the state in order to prevent his publicizing the fact that the PKK was aware it had been infiltrated by the MİT. The mole was Öcalan's pilot, Necati. Karasu alleges that they became aware of his MİT identity in May 1997, and misinformed him.

The deep state might have contracted the killing out to JITEM (see below).

Iran hypothesis 
His assassination was initially pinned on Iran.
According to this hypothesis, Iran's SAVAMA employed the virtually unknown Islamic Movement Organisation to carry out the assassination. Mehmet Ali Şeker, Mehmet Zeki Yıldırım, and Ayhan Usta were taken into custody. However, it was revealed that the police had falsified the date of their capture.
The İstanbul police had been conducting an operation targeting Islamist organizations, just before the attack. Its intelligence chief, Hanefi Avcı, said that the attackers left no trace of their affiliation. Rather, they seemed to have been well trained by a state.

During the course of the investigation, voluminous documents relating SAVAMA to the Kurdish Hezbollah were found. In addition, the Ankara police detained three suspects who were found to have stayed at a hotel in Ankara before the attack: Yusuf Karakuş, Abdülhamit Çelik, and Mehmet Şahin. Karakuş said that two Iranian spies were involved in the bombing: Muhammed Reza and Muhsin Karger Azad. Çelik, a.k.a. "Abdullah Gürgen", said he reported to Muhsin Karger Azad. Azad was ostensibly a consulate employee, but secretly an alleged Gladio member. 
Azad left Turkey after he was "named and shamed" in the newspapers along with other diplomats alleged to be spies.

Former Interior Minister Hasan Fehmi Güneş said that there was no doubt in his mind as to SAVAMA's involvement.

The alleged motivation for the Iran hypothesis is that Iran's leaders saw secularism as inimical to Islam, and Mumcu had to be killed because he was an outspoken promoter of it. However, others dispute the Iran hypothesis as the assassination coincided with a state visit from Iran to negotiate the passage of a natural gas pipeline from Iran, which was then subject to an embargo by the United States. Tensions flared after the assassination, and the $25 billion pipeline deal fell through.

CIA hypothesis 
In an earlier investigation, Mumcu had been on the CIA's trail. Working on the Mehmet Ali Ağca case, he was the first to discover the connection between the Turkish mafia and the Turkish extreme right. In his Cumhuriyet column, Mumcu named Ruzi Nazar as the CIA's liaison with the far-right Grey Wolves. The CIA's Turkey station chief, Paul Henze, and an American reporter accosted Mumcu to convince him to write that the Pope's assassin worked for Soviets or the Bulgarians, but Mumcu said he would simply follow the information trail. Henze left with an ominous "If you do that, you might find a nice surprise in store", according to his wife, Güldal.

JITEM hypothesis 
Abdülkadir Aygan, a JITEM informant from PKK, said that the assassination was carried out by JITEM operatives including Cem Ersever at the behest of General Veli Küçük, who years later, in 2008, was tried for allegedly being a high-ranking member of the Ergenekon network. Aygan said that he and Aytekin Özen had a briefcase of about 20 kg of C-4 (explosive), obtained from a Vietnam veteran, and that they had used some of it to assassinate the President of the Diyarbakir Bar, Mustafa Özer. The unnamed American soldier had allegedly given the explosives to the Regional Emergency Governorate in 1991 or 1992.

A confidential forensic report, dated 29 January 1993, was prepared by the chief of the Criminal Police Laboratory, Muhittin Kaya. It wrote that the plastic explosive weighed approximately 2.5 kg and contained RDX, as used in C-4s. However, it contradicted itself in explaining its origin, saying Czechoslovakia in the body, and the United States in the appendix.

MOSSAD hypothesis 
Uğur Mumcu's brother, Ceyhan Mumcu, finds the evidence for the JITEM/Ergenekon allegations weak. He suspects Israel's involvement since it supported Barzani and Talabani in the Gulf War. Israel's ambassador to Turkey had repeatedly requested to have lunch with Uğur, the only journalist to write about the dealings. Uğur agreed on the condition that he be allowed to bring a witness. The ambassador rejected the offer, and Mumcu died shortly thereafter.

Ceyhan Mumcu said his suspicions were supported by evidence uncovered in the Ergenekon investigation. A report seized from retired General Veli Küçük, dated 2 February 1993 and purportedly emanating from the MİT, says that the CIA and Israel's OADNA were involved.

Personal life
Uğur Mumcu was survived by his wife Güldal, and their children Özgür and Özge Mumcu. Güldal Mumcu and her children established the Uğur Mumcu Investigative Journalism Foundation in October 1994. 

Numerous parks, streets and monuments have been named after him.

Bibliography
 Mobilya Dosyası, um:ag (October 1975), 279 p., 
 Suçlular ve Güçlüler, Tekin (May 1977), 99 p., 
 Sakıncalı Piyade, um:ag (1977), 
 Bir Pulsuz Dilekçe, um:ag (1977), 
 Büyüklerimiz, um:ag (1978), 
 Çıkmaz Sokak, um:ag, 
 Tüfek İcad Oldu, um:ag, 
 Silah Kaçakçılığı ve Terör, um:ag (1981), 
 Söz Meclisten İçeri, um:ag (1981), 
 Ağca Dosyası, um:ag (February 1982), 175 p., 
 Terörsüz Özgürlük, um:ag, 
 Papa - Mafya - Ağca, um:ag, 
 Liberal Çiftlik, um:ag, 
 Devrimci ve Demokrat, um:ag, 
 Aybar İle Söyleşi, um:ag, 
 İnkılap Mektupları, um:ag, 
 Rabıta, um:ag, 
 12 Eylül Adaleti, um:ag, 
 Bir Uzun Yürüyüş, um:ag, 
 Tarikat - Siyaset - Ticaret, um:ag, 
 Kazım Karabekir Anlatıyor, um:ag, 
 40'ların Cadı Kazanı, um:ag, 
 Kürt İslam Ayaklanması 1919-1925, um:ag, 
 Gazi Paşa'ya Suikast, um:ag, 
 Sakıncalı Piyade (play), um:ag, 
 Söze Nereden Başlasam, um:ag (October 1999), 119 p., 
 Bu Düzen Böyle mi Gidecek?, um:ag, 
 Bomba Davası ve İlaç Dosyası, um:ag, 
 Sakıncasız (play), um:ag (November 1984), 112 p., 
 Eğilmeden Bükülmeden, um:ag (2004), 168 p., 
 Kürt Dosyası, Tekin (August 1993), 107 p.,

See also
 List of assassinated people from Turkey
 List of unsolved murders

References

Further reading

 

20th-century journalists
1942 births
1993 deaths
Ankara University Faculty of Law alumni
Assassinated Turkish journalists
Cumhuriyet people
Burials at Cebeci Asri Cemetery
Deaths by car bomb in Turkey
Journalists killed in Turkey
Male murder victims
Murdered Cumhuriyet columnists
People from Kırşehir
People killed by Islamic terrorism
People murdered in Turkey
Susurluk scandal
Turkish democracy activists
Turkish socialists
Unsolved murders in Turkey
1993 murders in Turkey